Van Dieren or VanDieren is a Dutch surname referring to people from the town of Dieren. Notable people with this name include:
Bernard van Dieren (1887–1936), Dutch composer and writer on music
Monica VanDieren, American mathematician
René van Dieren (born 1981), Dutch footballer

See also
Van Dieren, French publishing house